Nethwa is a village in the Sikar district of Indian state Rajasthan. It is part of the Shekhawati region.

Geography

Economy
The main occupation of the villagers is agriculture. Many people also work in government, and some people work in private industry.

Education
There are two schools in Nethwa: Government Secondary School and Karni Bal Mandir (KBM) Senior Secondary School, which is a private school.

References

External links
Villages in the Fatehpur tehsil, Sikar district

Villages in Sikar district